Mikhail Aleksandrovich Murnov (born 5 April 1978) is a former Russian professional football player.

Club career
He played 6 seasons in the Russian Football National League for 5 different clubs.

References

1978 births
People from Volgograd Oblast
Living people
Russian footballers
Association football defenders
FC Energiya Volzhsky players
FC Tekstilshchik Kamyshin players
FC Lada-Tolyatti players
FC Baltika Kaliningrad players
FC Sodovik Sterlitamak players
FC Rotor Volgograd players
Sportspeople from Volgograd Oblast